Rao Jingwen is a Chinese table tennis player. She won the bronze medal at the 2013 World Table Tennis Championships in the mixed doubles competition with partner Wang Liqin.

References

Chinese female table tennis players
Living people
Universiade medalists in table tennis
Table tennis players from Wuhan
World Table Tennis Championships medalists
Year of birth missing (living people)
Universiade gold medalists for China
Medalists at the 2007 Summer Universiade
Medalists at the 2011 Summer Universiade